Stiff Upper Lip is the 14th studio album by Australian hard rock band AC/DC. It was released in February  2000. The album was produced by George Young, older brother of Malcolm and Angus Young and this was the last AC/DC album that George produced before his death in 2017. The album was re-released in the US on  2007 as part of the AC/DC Remasters series. It was re-released in the UK in 2005.

Background
The Young brothers began writing songs for what would become Stiff Upper Lip in the summer of 1997 in London and the Netherlands with Malcolm on guitar and Angus on drums, and by February 1998 the songs were completed.  The band had planned on recording a new album with Canadian Bruce Fairbairn, who had produced the enormously successful The Razors Edge and AC/DC Live, but Fairbairn died in May 1999. The Youngs turned to their older brother George, who had produced 1988's Blow Up Your Video as well as the band's early albums with Harry Vanda, and Mike Fraser, who had co-produced 1995's Ballbreaker (with Rick Rubin), to complete Stiff Upper Lip.

Recording
The album was recorded and mixed at Bryan Adams' Warehouse Studios in Vancouver, British Columbia, Canada between September and November 1999 with a total of 18 songs recorded in all. In 2000, bassist Cliff Williams remarked to VH1s Behind the Music: "It's a killer album. It was a very easy-to-record album in as much as Malcolm and Angus had everything ready to go, so we basically just had to come along and perform as best we could." According to Arnaud Durieux's memoir AC/DC: Maximum Rock & Roll, Malcolm takes a rare guitar solo on "Can't Stand Still" while Angus does the backing vocals on "Hold Me Back". The album delves even deeper into the band's blues roots than its predecessor Ballbreaker and features a remarkably clean sound. In an interview with Alan Di Perna of Guitar World, singer Brian Johnson commented on working with George Young:

 In the past he's always worked with Harry [Vanda]. Not detracting from Harry, but it was kinda streamlined this time. You had no one to answer to or discuss things with except Malcolm or Angus. We were working pretty hard this time actually, from about 11 in the morning until one the next morning sometimes. Saturdays as well. It was good, though. George always had a game plan. I hate it when you're hanging around waiting for the next decision. George always had it all worked out.

Composition
Angus Young explained in interviews that the album title occurred to him when he was stuck in traffic and began ruminating on how vital lips were in rock and roll culture, citing icons Elvis Presley and Mick Jagger, and carried a certain sneering defiance.  He noted that he had contributed to this tradition himself:

 There was a bit of that and also with us there's always been a bit of humour, too. Even when we started, I used to always say, "I've got bigger lips than Jagger and I've got bigger lips than Presley when I stick them out."  Actually, if you look on the Highway to Hell album, there's my lip stuck up there like this [curls his lip]. I remember when I was a kid I saw an early black-and-white movie of Brigitte Bardot and she had those pouting lips and you go, "Well, yeah!  I like what she's serving!"
Songs reportedly recorded for the album that went unreleased were: "Let It Go", "R.I.P. It Up", "Whistle Blower", "Rave On" and "The Cock Crows".

Release 
The album cover features a bronze statue of Angus; mimicked on tour in the form of a prop – bearing his demonic likeness – that was several storeys high. The three singles from it were the title track "Stiff Upper Lip", "Safe in New York City", and "Satellite Blues".  In Australia, New Zealand and Europe, a two-disc tour edition of Stiff Upper Lip was released by Albert Productions in January 2001. This includes Stiff Upper Lip plus a disc comprising: "Cyberspace" (the B-side of "Safe in New York City"), five live tracks from 1996's No Bull, as well as three videos (for each of the singles).

The video for the title track – directed by Andy Morahan, – starts with the band driving down the street in a red 1997 Hummer H1 and being caught in a traffic jam. They pull into a back alley, get out, and begin to play the song on the street. The song that the band listens to before the car jam is "It's a Long Way to the Top (If You Wanna Rock 'n' Roll)", released when the late Bon Scott was a member.

In the wake of the 9/11 terrorist attacks, the song "Safe in New York City" was included in the 2001 Clear Channel memorandum, a list of "lyrically questionable" songs (six other AC/DC songs made the list: "Dirty Deeds Done Dirt Cheap," "Shot Down in Flames," "Shoot to Thrill," "Hell's Bells," "T.N.T.," and "Highway to Hell"). In a May 2000 interview with Alan Di Perna for Guitar World – just over a year prior to the tragedy – Angus Young was asked if he really felt safe in New York City: "That song is a little tongue in cheek. Last time I was in New York, that's all people were talking about: how safe it was, how it was gonna be such a great place to live. For me, New York has always been a city of unpredictability. You can never guess what's going to happen next."

Reception
Stiff Upper Lip rose to #7 on the U.S. Billboard chart and peaked at #12 in the United Kingdom.  It hit #1 in Finland, Sweden, Germany, and Austria. It was better received by critics than Ballbreaker but was considered lacking in new ideas.

Track listing

2001 deluxe edition disc 2

Stiff Upper Lip Live

Stiff Upper Lip Live is the name of the live video released in 2001 by AC/DC, recorded on 14 June 2001 at the Olympiastadion in Munich, Germany, on their Stiff Upper Lip Tour. The track listing is as follows:

 "Stiff Upper Lip" (Young, Young)
 "You Shook Me All Night Long" (Young, Young, Johnson)
 "Problem Child" (Young, Young, Scott)
 "Thunderstruck" (Young, Young)
 "Hell Ain't a Bad Place to Be" (Young, Young, Scott)
 "Hard as a Rock" (Young, Young)
 "Shoot to Thrill" (Young, Young, Johnson)
 "Rock and Roll Ain't Noise Pollution" (Young, Young, Johnson)
 "What Do You Do for Money Honey" (Young, Young, Johnson)
 "Bad Boy Boogie" (Young, Young, Scott)
 "Hells Bells" (Young, Young, Johnson)
 "Up to My Neck in You" (Young, Young, Scott)
 "The Jack" (Young, Young, Scott)
 "Back in Black" (Young, Young, Johnson)
 "Dirty Deeds Done Dirt Cheap" (Young, Young, Scott)
 "Highway to Hell" (Young, Young, Scott)
 "Whole Lotta Rosie" (Young, Young, Scott)
 "Let There Be Rock" (Young, Young, Scott)
 "T.N.T." (Young, Young, Scott)
 "For Those About to Rock (We Salute You)" (Young, Young, Johnson)
 "Shot Down in Flames" (Young, Young, Scott)

 Mastered in 5.1 by Ted Jensen at Sterling Sound, NYC

Notes
 There was an original newsflash that was used for the European tour, but an alternate one was used instead for the film after the 9/11 attacks in New York City. However, the original newsflash was made available on the Bonus disc of the 2007 DVD Plug Me In.

Personnel
 Brian Johnson – lead vocals
 Angus Young – lead guitar, backing vocals on "Hold Me Back"
 Malcolm Young – rhythm guitar, backing vocals
 Cliff Williams – bass guitar, backing vocals
 Phil Rudd – drums

 Additional personnel
 George Young – production
 Mike Fraser – engineering and mixing
 Dean Maher – assistant engineering
 Alvin Handwerker – business management
 Alli Truch – artwork

Charts

Weekly charts

Year-end charts

Certifications

References

2000 albums
AC/DC albums
Albums produced by George Young (rock musician)
Albums recorded at The Warehouse Studio
Elektra Records albums